Chauncey Samuel Boucher (14 June 1886 – 13 August 1955) was an American academic and historian.

Boucher was born in Chicago, Illinois, the son of Chauncey Watson Boucher and Elizabeth Celstea Van Loon. He was a professor of history at the University of Chicago; president of West Virginia University; and chancellor of the University of Nebraska. He died at Petoskey, Emmet, Michigan in 1955, aged 69.

References

1886 births
1955 deaths
20th-century American historians
American male non-fiction writers
University of Chicago faculty
University of Nebraska faculty
Presidents of West Virginia University
Chancellors of the University of Nebraska-Lincoln
20th-century American male writers
20th-century American academics